Aaron is a ghost town in Jackson County, Oklahoma, United States, located  northwest of Olustee.  It had a post office from January 22, 1899, until January 14, 1905.  The town was named after Calvin Aaron, an early settler.

References

Former populated places in Jackson County, Oklahoma
Ghost towns in Oklahoma